The Roman Catholic Diocese of Humaitá is a diocese located in the city of Humaitá in the Ecclesiastical province of Porto Velho in Brazil.

Ordinaries
José Domitrovitsch, S.D.B. † (5 Aug 1961 Appointed - 27 Feb 1962 Died)
Miguel d’Aversa, S.D.B. † (21 May 1962 Appointed - 6 Mar 1991 Retired)
José Jovêncio Balestieri, S.D.B. (6 Mar 1991 Appointed - 29 Jul 1998 Appointed, Coadjutor Bishop of Rio do Sul, Santa Catarina)
Franz Josef Meinrad Merkel, C.S.Sp. (26 Jul 2000 Appointed - 12 Aug 2020 Retired)
Antônio Fontinele de Melo (12 Aug 2020 Appointed - )

History
 26 June 1961: Established as Territorial Prelature of Humaitá from the Metropolitan Archdiocese of Manaus and Territorial Prelature of Porto Velho
 16 October 1979: Promoted as Diocese of Humaitá

Leadership, in reverse chronological order
 Bishops of Humaitá (Roman rite), below
 Bishop Franz Josef Meinrad Merkel, C.S.Sp. (2000.07.26 – present)
 Bishop José Jovêncio Balestieri, S.D.B. (1991.03.06 – 1998.07.29)
 Bishop Miguel D’Aversa, S.D.B. (1979.10.16 – 1991.03.06)
 Prelates of Humaitá (Roman Rite), below
 Bishop Miguel D’Aversa, S.D.B. (1962.05.21 – 1979.10.16)
 Bishop José Domitrovitsch, S.D.B. (1961.08.05 – 1962.02.27)

References
 GCatholic.org
 Catholic Hierarchy

Roman Catholic dioceses in Brazil
Humaitá, Amazonas
Christian organizations established in 1961
Humaitá, Roman Catholic Diocese of
Roman Catholic dioceses and prelatures established in the 20th century
1961 establishments in Brazil